

Episodes

Mighty Morphin Power Rangers

Mighty Morphin Alien Rangers (Season 3.5, 1996)

Power Rangers Zeo (Season 4, 1996)

Power Rangers Turbo (Season 5, 1997)

Power Rangers in Space (Season 6, 1998)

Power Rangers Lost Galaxy (Season 7, 1999)

Power Rangers Lightspeed Rescue (Season 8, 2000)

Power Rangers Time Force (Season 9, 2001)

Power Rangers Wild Force (Season 10, 2002)

Power Rangers Ninja Storm (Season 11, 2003)

Power Rangers Dino Thunder (Season 12, 2004)

Power Rangers S.P.D. (Season 13, 2005)

Power Rangers Mystic Force (Season 14, 2006)

Power Rangers Operation Overdrive (Season 15, 2007)

 

Power Rangers